The Howard Journal of Crime and Justice (and prior to 2016,  The Howard Journal of Criminal Justice) is an academic journal published by Wiley-Blackwell on behalf of the Howard League for Penal Reform five times each year. The editors-in-chief are David Wilson and J. Robert Lilly.

Herschel Albert Prins was on its editorial board in the 1980s.

External links

References

Criminology journals
Wiley-Blackwell academic journals
Publications established in 1921
English-language journals
5 times per year journals
Criminal law journals